Küchenmeister is a German surname:

 Dieter Küchenmeister (1935-2011), Austrian curler and sports executive
 Friedrich Küchenmeister, German physician
 Walter Küchenmeister, member of the anti-fascist resistance group, the Red Orchestra
 Wera Küchenmeister, East German author
 Claus Küchenmeister, East German author and father of Walter Küchenmeister